David Julian Fawcett (born 23 October 1963) is an Australian Liberal Party politician who has been a Senator for South Australia since 2011. Fawcett served in the Morrison Government as Assistant Minister for Defence from 2018 to 2019.

Fawcett was previously elected to federal parliament, serving for one term as member for the House of Representatives seat of Wakefield in South Australia, elected at the 2004 election.

Early life
Fawcett was born on 23 October 1963 in Narrabri, New South Wales. His family is originally from Kapunda, South Australia. He spent part of his childhood in Thailand where his father had been sent under the Colombo Plan. He returned to Australia in 1975 to attend Prince Alfred College in Adelaide.

Military service
Fawcett graduated from the Royal Military College Duntroon with a Bachelor of Science in 1985. He joined the Australian Army Aviation Corps and qualified as a pilot, flying fixed-wing aircraft and helicopters. He qualified as a test pilot through the Empire Test Pilots' School in 1993 and was a senior flying instructor at the Oakey Army Aviation Centre, finishing his full-time military service in 2004. He was posted to Royal Australian Air Force Aircraft Research and Development Unit (ARDU) at Edinburgh, South Australia as an Army helicopter test pilot. He held a number of positions in ARDU and the Defence Acquisition Organisation, culminating in his final appointment as Commanding Officer, responsible for flight test programs for all of the Australian Defence Force aircraft. He reached the rank of Lieutenant Colonel before leaving the ADF to enter politics.

Parliament
Prior to the 2004 election, the seat of Wakefield had been dramatically altered in a redistribution. The seat had long been a safe rural Liberal seat stretching from the Yorke Peninsula through to the Riverland and the state's border, but upon the abolition of the safe metropolitan Labor seat of Bonython, Wakefield was moved to take in the outer northern Adelaide suburb of Elizabeth and part of Salisbury, spanning through to the rural mid-north town of Clare—roughly a fifth the size of its former incarnation. The Liberals held the old Wakefield with a comfortably safe two-party margin of 14.6 points, but the new Wakefield was notionally a marginal Labor seat with a two-party margin of just 1.3 points. The previous Liberal member, Neil Andrew, believed this made Wakefield unwinnable and opted not to recontest the seat in 2004.  However, Fawcett narrowly defeated the Labor candidate, ex-Bonython MP Martyn Evans, on a swing of 2.2 points, taking the seat on Family First preferences. Despite an extensive campaign at the 2007 election, Fawcett was defeated by Labor's Nick Champion, suffering a large swing of 7.2 points.

Fawcett was elected as a Liberal Senator in South Australia at the 2010 election and assumed his seat on 1 July 2011.

Fawcett is a member of the Centre-Right faction of the Liberal Party.

Personal life
Fawcett is married with two children. He has been involved in leadership positions at Clovercrest Baptist Church in Modbury North, Adelaide and Tyndale Christian School in Salisbury East, Adelaide. He has been a contributing member of the Society of Experimental Test Pilots and the Australian Flight Test Society.

Notes

References

External links
 Summary of parliamentary voting for Senator David Fawcett on TheyVoteForYou.org.au
 

1963 births
Living people
Liberal Party of Australia members of the Parliament of Australia
Members of the Australian Senate
Members of the Australian Senate for South Australia
Members of the Australian House of Representatives
Members of the Australian House of Representatives for Wakefield
Australian Army officers
University of New South Wales alumni
Royal Military College, Duntroon graduates
People educated at Prince Alfred College
Turnbull Government
21st-century Australian politicians
Australian Baptists
Morrison Government